Eric Anthony Roberts (born April 18, 1956) is an American actor. His career began with a leading role in King of the Gypsies (1978) for which he received his first Golden Globe Award nomination. He was nominated again at the Golden Globes for his role in Bob Fosse's Star 80 (1983). Roberts' performance in Runaway Train (1985), as prison escapee Buck McGeehy, earned him a third Golden Globe nod and a nomination for the Academy Award for Best Supporting Actor. He is the older brother of actress Julia Roberts.

In a career spanning over 40 years Roberts has amassed more than 700 credits, including Raggedy Man (1981), The Pope of Greenwich Village (1984), Runaway Train, The Specialist (1994), Cecil B. Demented (2000), National Security (2003), A Guide to Recognizing Your Saints (2006), The Dark Knight (2008), The Expendables (2010), Inherent Vice (2014), The Institute (2017), and Head Full of Honey (2018). His equally varied television work includes three seasons with the sitcom Less than Perfect, as well as recurring roles on the NBC drama Heroes and the CBS soap opera The Young and the Restless, as well as Saved by the Light, the legal drama Suits, Fox's The Finder, and the only non-UK actor to play the Master in the 1996 Doctor Who television film.

Since the 1970s, he is one of few actors to have more than 700 credits (blockbusters, independent films, animated films, TV series, animated series, short films and student films).

Early life
Eric Anthony Roberts was born in Biloxi, Mississippi, on April 18, 1956, to Betty Lou Bredemus and Walter Grady Roberts, one-time actors and playwrights, who met while touring with a production of George Washington Slept Here for the armed forces. In 1963, they co-founded the Atlanta Actors and Writers Workshop in Atlanta off Juniper Street in Midtown. They ran a children's acting school in Decatur, Georgia. Roberts' mother became a church secretary and real estate agent, and his father was a vacuum cleaner salesman. Roberts's younger siblings, Julia Roberts (from whom he was estranged until 2004) and Lisa Roberts Gillan, are also actors.

Roberts' parents filed for divorce in 1971 and it was finalized early in 1972. He stayed with his father, who died of cancer in March 1977, in Atlanta. His sisters moved with their mother to Smyrna, a suburb of Atlanta, after the divorce. In 1972, she married Michael Motes, and had a daughter with him in 1976, Nancy Motes, who died February 9, 2014, at age 37, of an apparent drug overdose. Motes was abusive and often unemployed. In 1983, she divorced Motes, citing "cruelty"; she later said that marrying him was the biggest mistake of her life.

Roberts is of English, Scottish, Irish, Welsh, German, and Swedish descent.

Career

Roberts got his start on the now-defunct NBC daytime soap opera Another World originating the role of Ted Bancroft from February 14 to June 17, 1977.

Roberts received Golden Globe Award nominations for his early starring roles in King of the Gypsies (1978) and Star 80 (1983). He was nominated for the Academy Award for Best Supporting Actor in 1985 for his role as the escaped convict Buck in the film Runaway Train; the award went to Don Ameche for Cocoon. In 1987, he won the Theatre World Award for his Broadway debut performance in Burn This.

Roberts' other starring roles included Paul's Case (1980), Raggedy Man (1981), The Pope of Greenwich Village (1984), The Coca-Cola Kid (1985), Nobody's Fool (1986), Best of the Best (1989), By the Sword (1991), Final Analysis (1992), Best of the Best 2 (1993), The Specialist (1994), The Immortals (1995), La Cucaracha (1998), and Purgatory (1999).

In 1996, he appeared in the Doctor Who television film in the role of the Master.  When SFX listed previous Masters in Doctor Who, the magazine said of Roberts: "Out-acted by a CGI snake in the same production." The onscreen wife of Roberts's human character, who is killed by her newly possessed husband taken over by the Master, is played by his real-life wife. He also co-starred in the 1996 television miniseries version of In Cold Blood, in the role of Perry Smith; he was nominated as Best Actor in a Miniseries or a Motion Picture Made for Television. He starred in C-16 for its entire 1997 to 1998 run. He starred opposite John Ritter in the movie Tripfall in 1998. He played the Archangel Michael in The Prophecy II (1997).

Roberts co-starred on the ABC situation comedy Less than Perfect. He appeared in an episode of CSI: Miami as Ken Kramer, a murderer on death row convicted of killing a young couple. Another notable TV appearance was the episode "Victims" of Law & Order: Special Victims Unit where he played Sam Winfield, a former cop turned vigilante. In the same year, he was also guest-starred on The L Word as Gabriel McCutcheon, the father of Shane McCutcheon.

Roberts voiced the Superman villain Mongul in the animated series Justice League, and reprised his role in Justice League Unlimited in the episode "For the Man Who Has Everything". He performed the voice of Dark Danny in Nickelodeon's Danny Phantom. He appeared in the first season of Heroes as Thompson, an associate of Mr. Bennet. He then reprised the role in the third-season episode "Villains" and in the fourth-season "The Wall".

In 2000, Roberts played a serial killer in The Flying Dutchman. In 2002, he portrayed an FBI detective in Ja Rule's music video for his song "Down Ass Bitch", as well as its sequel "Down 4 U".

In 2003, Roberts also appeared in The Killers' music video for their song "Mr. Brightside", later reprising the role in the music video for their 2012 single "Miss Atomic Bomb".

In 2005, he appeared in the music videos for Mariah Carey's "We Belong Together" and "It's Like That".

In 2006, he starred in the drama movie A Guide to Recognizing Your Saints. The movie was a success and earned $2,035,468 at the box-office and holds a 75% "Certified Fresh" rating on Rotten Tomatoes. he appeared in the video for Akon's "Smack That", featuring Eminem. The same year, he had a role in the romantic comedy film Phat Girlz, starring Mo'Nique, which receive good review and generate $7,401,890 in theaters worldwide. He had a major role in the British-German-American martial arts action film DOA: Dead or Alive, based on the famous videogame of the same name, which grossed $7.5 million on a budget of $30 million.

In early January 2007, Roberts starred in the two-part miniseries Pandemic as the mayor of Los Angeles. In 2007, he appeared in the video for Godhead's "Hey You". He appeared as a panelist on the television game show Hollywood Squares.

On July 18, 2008, he appeared in The Dark Knight as Sal Maroni, a Gotham City Mafia boss who hires The Joker to kill Batman and a renegade mob accountant.

In February 2009, Oscar nominee Mickey Rourke, who starred with Roberts in The Pope of Greenwich Village, said he hoped that Roberts would soon be offered a role which would resurrect his career in the way that The Wrestler rejuvenated Rourke's. He portrayed Seth Blanchard on the second season of the Starz series Crash, from 2009. In 2009, Roberts appeared as himself in "Tree Trippers", a season five episode of Entourage. He is portrayed as a mushroom and drug fanatic as he gives the boys mushrooms and joins them in Joshua Tree National Park to trip as they contemplate Vince's next movie decision.
The same year, he appeared in the independent movie The Chaos Experiment, starring Val Kilmer which had a limited theatrical release, playing to small audiences on two screens for one week in Grand Rapids, and for one week in nearby Lansing. He also appeared in the independent movie Rock Slyde, starring Patrick Warburton, Andy Dick, Rena Sofer, and Elaine Hendrix. He had the main role in the action movie The Butcher. He was acted in the psychological thriller film Royal Kill. He also appeared in the Canadian-American thriller Bloodwork.

It was announced in June 2010 that he would be joining the cast of the CBS soap opera The Young and the Restless starting July 12. The following month saw the release of the action film The Expendables in which Roberts plays a lead villain. It was directed by and starred Sylvester Stallone, with Jason Statham, Jet Li, Steve Austin, Gary Daniels, Dolph Lundgren, Randy Couture, Terry Crews, David Zayas, and Mickey Rourke. The film is about a group of elite mercenaries called The Expendables (Stallone, Statham, Li, Lundgren, Couture, and Crews) who are on a mission to overthrow dictator General Garza (Zayas) in Vilena, an island in the Gulf of Mexico. It is revealed that an ex-CIA officer James Munroe (Roberts) is keeping Garza in power as a figurehead for his own profiteering operations. With his two deadly bodyguards Dan Paine (Austin) and The Brit (Daniels), they become a major obstacle in the way of The Expendables. Later that year, he appeared with Steve Austin and Gary Daniels, his co-stars from The Expendables, in the 2010 action film Hunt to Kill. In October 2010, he played the major role in the American family movie First Dog, which received positive reviews. December 2010 saw the premiere of the fourth season of Celebrity Rehab with Dr. Drew, which documented Roberts's struggle with dependency on medical marijuana. His wife Eliza and his stepson Keaton Simons appeared in episode 6 to discuss the effects of his addiction on their lives.

In 2011, he guest-starred in USA Network's Burn Notice season 5 finale ("Fail Safe") as an "off the books" spy recruiter. In the same year, he acted in the drama and family film Shannon's Rainbow, based on Mowod's own experiences seeing his brother rehabilitate an injured horse and win a championship horse race. Later that year he acted in the horror comedy anthology film Chillerama, consisting of four stories, with each segment being an homage to a different genre and style. The movie was acclaimed by critics and has gained a cult following.

Roberts starred in the 2012 mystery thriller Deadline, playing the role of politically incorrect reporter Ronnie Bullock. He appeared in the horror film Snow White: A Deadly Summer, directed by David DeCoteau. He is featured as Uncle Shadrack, head of a Romani family, in 2012's The Finder on FOX. He had a recurring role in the TV series The Finder as a gypsy who had the title of king among a gypsy community in southern Florida. The same year, he was starred in the catastrophe movie The Mark. He also appeared in the Christmas comedy film Christmas in Compton, starring Keith David and Omar Gooding, which received positives reviews.

On February 18, 2013, he was featured in independent children's film A Talking Cat!?!, directed by David DeCoteau. In 2013, he had a small role in the film Lovelace, a biopic film about adult film actress Linda Lovelace. The film had its world premiere on January 22, 2013, at the 2013 Sundance Film Festival and opened in a U.S. limited release on August 9, 2013. The same year, he was starred in the movie Pop Star, including the actors Christian Serratos, Robert Adamson, Ross Thomas and Rachele Brooke Smith. He had also in the drama film Before I Sleep, which received good critics and premiered in competition at the Heartland Film Festival on October 19, 2013. On November 1, 2013, he had a major role in the thriller drama film Assumed Killer, starring and produced by Casper Van Dien. The movie received good review and had the film two stars out of five. On November 24, 2013, he had voiced in the short animated movie Dante's Hell Animated.

In 2014, he starred in neo-noir period comedy-drama film Inherent Vice, including Joaquin Phoenix, Josh Brolin, Owen Wilson, Katherine Waterston, Reese Witherspoon, Benicio del Toro, Jena Malone, Joanna Newsom, Jeannie Berlin, Maya Rudolph, Michael K. Williams, and Martin Short. Inherent Vice premiered at the New York Film Festival on October 4, 2014, and began a limited theatrical release in the United States on December 12, 2014. Critical reception was divided; while some argued the film had a convoluted plot and lacked coherence, others praised the cast, particularly Brolin, Phoenix and Waterston. The film was nominated for a number of awards, including two Academy Awards and a Best Actor Golden Globe Award for Phoenix. The National Board of Review named it one of the ten best films of the year. Some critics have said that Inherent Vice has the makings of a cult film. In 2016, it was voted the 75th best film since 2000 in an international critics' poll. The drama film Starcrossed, co-starring Mischa Barton, premiered at the San Diego International Film Festival on 28 September 2014. This was followed by a limited theatrical release in Los Angeles in May 2016. He had also a role in the small-budget indie film The Opposite Sex, starring Kristin Chenoweth, Mena Suvari, Jennifer Finnigan, and Geoff Stults, which received favorable reviews.

Between 2014 and 2015 Roberts played the recurring character Charles Forstman in the TV legal drama Suits.

In 2015, he appeared in season 5 of Lost Girl, a Canadian TV show on Showcase, as the main character, Bo's, father. In 2015 he appeared in the Rihanna video "Bitch Better Have My Money" and in Chris Cornell's video for "Nearly Forgot My Broken Heart."

The Nigerian comedy drama movie A Trip to Jamaica, starring Eric Roberts, Ayo Makun, Funke Akindele, Nse Ikpe Etim, and Dan Davies, had its worldwide premiere on September 25, 2016 in Lagos State. In November 2016, the film was reported to have grossed 168 million naira, breaking the previous record set by 30 Days in Atlanta. It also broke records for the first film to hit 35 million in first weekend, the first film to hit 62 million in its first week, the fastest film to gross 100 million (17 days) and the fastest film to gross 150 million (six weeks). It opened at the Odeon Cinemas in London in December 2016 and became the highest-grossing film that weekend in London while also becoming the highest per screen average film in the UK during its limited run. It won the Africa Entertainment Legends Award (AELA) for Best Cinema Film of 2016 and received four nominations at the 2017 Africa Magic Viewers Choice Awards, including categories for best actress in a comedy, best writer, best movie (West Africa) and best actor in a comedy. The award show was held in March 2017 in Lagos State. The same year, Roberts was featured in season 4 of the hit American TV show Brooklyn Nine-Nine; he portrayed the character of Jimmy Figgis. He played Robert Avery in Grey's Anatomy.

In 2017, he had a major role in the horror thriller film The Institute, alongside James Franco and Pamela Anderson.

Roberts is a Ficore member of SAG-AFTRA and works on union as well as non-union projects.

In 2018, he appeared in the third series of UK Channel4 reality show Celebrity Island with Bear Grylls where he completed the 4 weeks on the island. The same year, he also featured in the video of Enrique Iglesias' latest track "El Baño" as a bartender. He had a role in the drama film Papa, alongside Robert Scott Wilson, Paul Sorvino, Daryl Hannah, Mischa Barton, Frankie Avalon, Ann-Margret, and Michael Madsen which received favorables reviews. In 2018, he acted in the movie Head Full of Honey which stars Matt Dillon.

In a 2018 Vanity Fair interview, Roberts traced his prolific filmography to when he stopped getting consistent offers from major film studios and started doing B movies. “I start making a bunch of B movies—bam bam bam bam bam bam—one after the other, and then suddenly two, three years have passed, and I made like 30 films in two, three years," Roberts recalled.

In 2019, he starred in the crime thriller drama Night Walk, starring Mickey Rourke. He had a major role in the action movie The Reliant, alongside Kevin Sorbo. He also appears on the sci-fi movie The Immortal Wars: Resurgence. He acted in the crime/thriller 90 Feet From Home, including Dean Cain. He also played a supporting role in the family movie A Karate Christmas Miracle. Also in 2019, 23 years after initially playing the role, Roberts reprised his version of the Master, working with Big Finish Productions.  He made his debut in series 5 of the spinoff series, The Diary of River Song. Later that year, he appeared in the finale of the Eighth Doctor story line, Ravenous, once more working opposite Paul McGann.

In 2020, he starred in several movies including Reboot Camp, Angels Fallen, The Unbreakable Sword, Deported, Collision Earth, Hayalet : 3 Yasam and Top Gunner. Furthermore, he starred in the DC Comics short movie Pamela & Ivy and appeared in the fan-made movie Gambit: Playing for Keeps.

In January 2021, Roberts reprised the role of the Master in Masterful, a special audio drama release celebrating the 50th anniversary of the debut of that character. In March 2021, he appeared in his own spinoff series, Master! as well. The same year, he took part in the horror movie Escape to the Cove, appeared in the acclaimed short drama The Sleepless, guest starred again in season 17, episode 14 on the TV show Grey's Anatomy, acted in the comedy Peach Cobbler, starred in the TV movie Mommy's Deadly Con Artist. He was also involved in the drama movie After Masks, the horror film 616 Wilford Lane and the comedy Mr. Birthday.

Personal life
Roberts is a vegan and supporter of animal rights.

He holds a black belt in Taekwondo and has demonstrated his skills as a fighter in the Best of the Best franchise.

Relationships and family
A 1989 profile of actress Sandy Dennis in People says she had a live-in relationship with Roberts for five years at a seven-bedroom house she rented in Connecticut.  The relationship began several years after her 1974 parting from boyfriend Gerry Mulligan, a jazz musician who had lived with Dennis in the same house (whose Connecticut location was identified as Westport or Wilton in different People magazine articles).

In 1981, some months after Roberts began living with Dennis, he was in a debilitating car accident near their home.  His ordeal was described by People magazine years later as “a month-long hospital stay after a bad car accident in 1981. ‘I tried to climb a tree in a CJ-5 [brand name for his Jeep],’ he says. Leaving the Wilton, Conn, house of his then girlfriend, actress Sandy Dennis, 44 at the time, Eric hopped into his doorless Jeep for a ride with her German shepherd. The dog leaned out too far. Roberts released the steering wheel to get a hold on the wayward pooch and ended up in a coma for three days.” Dennis, an animal lover who cared for a lot of dogs and cats, was relieved to learn her German shepherd was not injured in the accident. After Roberts recovered, his live-in relationship with Dennis lasted a few more years.

Roberts has a daughter, Emma, from a live-in relationship with Kelly Cunningham; Emma was born on February 10, 1991. She eventually became an actress as well, making her major-film debut at age 10 in the 2001 drama Blow. After Roberts's relationship with Cunningham, he married Eliza Garrett (daughter of actors David Rayfiel and Lila Garrett) in 1992. His stepson, Keaton Simons, is a singer-songwriter, and his stepdaughter, Morgan Simons, is a chef. Roberts became a grandfather for the first time in December of 2020 when Emma gave birth to her first child, a son named Rhodes, with actor Garrett Hedlund.

On January 12, 2001, Roberts visited The Howard Stern Radio Show with Garrett, during a segment called "The Gossip Game" with Mike Walker of the National Enquirer. He confirmed that he and his sister, Julia, had been estranged for several years. The source of the estrangement had been his past drug abuse and her siding with his ex-girlfriend over the custody of his daughter. In 2004, he told People magazine that he and his sister reconciled when he visited her in the hospital after she gave birth to twins.

Legal issues
In 1987, Roberts was arrested for possession of cocaine and marijuana, and resisting arrest after he tried to assault a New York police officer. 

In February 1995, Roberts was arrested for shoving his wife into a wall.

References

External links
 
 
 Official channel on YouTube
 
 
 
 The Oracle of Bacon - The Center of the Hollywood Universe

1956 births
American people of Scandinavian descent
20th-century American male actors
21st-century American male actors
American male film actors
American male soap opera actors
American male television actors
American male voice actors
American male taekwondo practitioners
Living people
Male actors from Atlanta
Male actors from Mississippi
People from Biloxi, Mississippi
American people of English descent
American people of German descent
American people of Irish descent
American people of Scottish descent
American people of Swedish descent
American people of Welsh descent
Eric